Kenya Muslim Academy is a private primary and secondary school located in Kariobangi Nairobi Kenya, admitting both Muslims and non-Muslims. 

The school was established in the year 1993 by SUPKEM . 

Motto:
IQRA (Power to read)

The school is running both primary and secondary levels of education with a good academic performance record. The primary section is fully Islamically integrated; teaching both secular and Islamic subjects such as Quran, Tawhid, Fiqh, Sira, Hadith, Arabic, Tafsir and Tajwid fully taught in Arabic and following the ICDC syllabus. 

The secondary section is also integrated offering Arabic language and IRE (Islamic Religious Education) together with secular subjects. There are good boarding facilities for both the secondary and primary sections.
 
Currently, the school is directed by Sheikh Abdukadir and managed by Mr. Aden Abdukadir under a board of management composed of experts from different fields. The board's chairperson is Mr. Ali Hassan. 

The head of Islamic department which manages the integrated program is Dr. Hajj Maulid Makokha a graduate from the Islamic University of Madina - Saudi Arabia.

The school has good educational facilities such as spacious classrooms, science laboratories, a mosque, a library and several playgrounds.

See also

 List of schools in Kenya

References

External links
SUPKEM
Schools in Nairobi
High schools and secondary schools in Kenya
Elementary and primary schools in Kenya
Islamic schools in Africa
1993 establishments in Kenya
Educational institutions established in 1993
Private schools in Kenya